Chapters is the third international studio album (sixth overall release) by Malaysian singer-songwriter, Yuna released on May 20, 2016, through Verve Records. The album is the follow-up to her second international studio album Nocturnal (2013), and features guest appearances from Usher and Jhené Aiko. Chapters made its way to the top 10 of the Billboard’s Best R&B Albums of 2016: Critic’s Picks and Rolling Stone's 20 Best R&B Albums of 2016.

One of the songs in the album, "All I Do" was chosen as the soundtrack for the pilot episode of 13th season of Grey's Anatomy.

Background
Prior to the album's release, it has been reported in October 2015 that Yuna's upcoming studio album which is 90 percent to completed and originally to be released by February 2016. In an exclusive interview with Utusan Malaysia, Yuna said about the album:

Yuna revealed the album title, Chapters in an interview with The Fader on February 19, 2016, and announced May 20 as the album's release date.

Singles
A total of six singles were released during 2016 and 2017 to support the album. The lead single, "Crush" featuring Usher was released on February 29, 2016. The song debuted at No. 24 and has peaked at No. 1 on the Malaysia Music Weekly, the first and only single to reach the top of the list in one week. As of March 9, the song peaked on the singles list at No. 12 (Indonesia), No. 17 (Singapore), No. 6 (Cambodia) and No. 3 (United States R&B Billboard). "Crush" was the first song on Yuna to receive gold certification from RIAA with certified sales of 500,000 copies, in April 2019, three years following its release.

"Lanes" was in May 2016 the second single released. "Mannequin" and "Poor Heart" were released in September and October respectively.

The fifth single, "Best Love" was released in January 2017 to a moderate success, peaking higher than "Crush" at No. 2 on the Billboard Adult R&B Songs.

"Unrequited Love" was released in February 2017 as the sixth and final single of Chapters.

Promotional singles
The first promotional single, "Places To Go" in collaboration with DJ Premier was released on February 20, 2016.

Critical reception
Gail Mitchell from Billboard wrote that this compelling album proves through such Sade-channeling selections as "Best Love" and "Unrequited Love". Rolling Stone opined that Chapters, segmented like pages torn from a diary, than its occasional starry cameos or production from alt-R&B heavyweight Robin Hannibal. Her emotional sincerity is underlined by her quiet yet insistent voice, and she often sounds like she is whispering as she lyrically dismantles her ex-lover's arguments. Much of Chapters finds her falling out of love, but there are a few happy moments in this beautifully broken valentine. Writing for Star2.com, Angelin Yeoh praises Yuna for her ability to turn heartbreaks into stellar numbers in Chapters. Where as Pulse undoubtedly louded "Chapters" as Yuna's best work ever as the album perfectly highlights her vocal maturity. Sputnikmusic praised for the album productions, stating "It has to be said that Chapters’ spacious production does wonders for Yuna's tender soprano, and when the two elements manage to combine over an honest-to-goodness number, such as in the case of "All I Do" and “Too Close”, the result is good enough to make heartbreak contemporaries Adele and Jessie Ware blush." However on the negative side described the bulk of the material she's working with, "unfortunately, is on a lower level."

Year-end lists

Certifications

Track listing

Personnel 
Credits adapted from Chapters booklet liner notes and Discogs.

 A&R – Ben Willis (2), Mike Rittberg (2)
 A&R [Coordinator, Administrator] – Evelyn Morgan
 Art Direction – Yuna
 Design – Made In Katana
 Edited By [Additional] – Robert Castillo (2) (tracks: 2, 5, 8)
 Engineer – Aaron Espinoza (tracks: 5, 7), Bryan Todd (tracks: 10), Christian Plata (tracks: 1, 3, 4, 6, 9, 12, 13), Fisticuffs (2) (tracks: 1, 3, 4, 6, 9, 12, 13), Jochem van der Saag (tracks: 10), Jorge Vivo (tracks: 10)
 Executive Producer – Ben Willis (2), Fisticuffs (2)
 Legal – Peter Rosenthal, Esq., Ritholz Levy
 Management – Benjamin Willis*, Indie-Pop
 Mastered By – Chris Gehringer
 Mixed By – DJ Premier (tracks: 11), Erik Madrid (tracks: 1 to 8, 12, 13), Jochem van der Saag (tracks: 9, 10)
 Mixed By [Assistant] – Ellis Tucker (tracks: 1 to 8, 12, 13)
 Photography By – Aris Jerome
 Product Manager – Holly Adams
 Production Manager – Kam Sangha
 Recorded By – Parks (8) (tracks: 11), King Of Chill* (tracks: 11)
 Recorded By [Jhené Aiko Vocals] – Jim Caruana (tracks: 6)
 Recorded By [Usher Vocals] – Mark "Exit" Goodchild (tracks: 3)
 Recorded By [Vocals] – Alex Williams (9) (tracks: 11)
 Technician [Vocal Production, Assistant] – Kory Aaron (tracks: 3)
 Technician [Vocal Production] – Natural (10) (tracks: 3)
 Tracking By [Vocals] – Tucker Robinson (tracks: 2, 5, 7, 8)
 Vocals – Yuna
 Phonographic Copyright (p) – The Verve Music Group
 Copyright (c) – The Verve Music Group
 Manufactured By – Universal Music Distribution
 Distributed By – Universal Music Distribution
 Mastered At – Sterling Sound

Charts

Release history

References

Yuna (singer) albums
2016 albums
Verve Records albums
Albums produced by DJ Premier